Portnaluchaig is a coastal hamlet, located 2 miles north of Arisaig in the Highlands of Scotland and is also in the council area of Highland.

The Small Isles of Eigg, Muck and Rùm are visible from Portnaluchaig.

Populated places in Lochaber